The Queens Own Cameron Highlanders Museum is a military museum in Winnipeg, Manitoba. The museum located at the Minto Armoury is dedicated to Manitoba's famous Scottish regiment, The Queen's Own Cameron Highlanders of Canada, which was first raised in 1910.

History
The Queen's Own Cameron Highlanders of Canada served with distinction in World War I, providing 5 battalions in the Canadian Expeditionary Force (the 16th, 27th, 43rd, 174th and 179th). The Regiment also participated in the 1942 Dieppe Raid and throughout northwest Europe in World War II.

Collections
The museum displays artifacts and photographs of The Queen's Own Cameron Highlanders of Canada Regiment.

Gallery

Affiliations
The Museum is affiliated with the CMA,  CHIN, OMMC, and Virtual Museum of Canada.

See also

Canadian Warplane Heritage Museum
Cold Lake Air Force Museum
Commonwealth Air Training Plan Museum
Comox Air Force Museum
Great War Flying Museum
Military history of Canada
National Air Force Museum of Canada
Organization of Military Museums of Canada
Secrets of Radar Museum
The Queen's Own Cameron Highlanders of Canada

References

 History of the Canadian Forces Museums 1919-2004

Queen's Own Cameron Highlanders of Canada Museum
Queen's Own Cameron Highlanders of Canada Museum
Queen's Own Cameron Highlanders of Canada